Quenton Jackson (born September 15, 1998) is an American professional basketball player for the Washington Wizards of the National Basketball Association (NBA), on a two-way contract with the Capital City Go-Go of the NBA G League. He played college basketball for the College of Central Florida Patriots and the Texas A&M Aggies.

High school career
Jackson attended Mira Costa High School. He missed a month and a half with a wrist injury as a senior.

College career
Jackson began his college career at the College of Central Florida. As a sophomore, he averaged 18.3 points, 5.2 rebounds and three assists per game. Jackson transferred to Texas A&M, choosing the Aggies over Arkansas, LSU, Texas and West Virginia.  He averaged 8.8 points and 2.9 rebounds per game as a junior. As a senior, Jackson averaged 10.4 points, 2.4 rebounds and 1.7 assists per game. Following the season, he opted to return for an additional year of eligibility. Jackson led Texas A&M to the NIT final in his last season, averaging 14.8 points, 3.5 rebounds, 2.0 assists and 1.8 steals per game.

Professional career
After going undrafted in the 2022 NBA draft, Jackson signed an Exhibit 10 contract with the Washington Wizards on September 13, 2022. He was waived by the Wizards on October 15, and he subsequently joined the Capital City Go-Go, the Wizards' NBA G League affiliate.

Washington Wizards (2023–present)
On February 10, 2023, Jackson signed a two-way contract with the Wizards.

Career statistics

College

|-
| style="text-align:left;"| 2019–20
| style="text-align:left;"| Texas A&M
| 29 || 8 || 23.6 || .366 || .244 || .760 || 2.9 || 1.6 || 1.2 || 0.2 || 8.8
|-
| style="text-align:left;"| 2020–21
| style="text-align:left;"| Texas A&M
| 18 || 10 || 23.4 || .474 || .411 || .736 || 2.4 || 1.7 || 1.2 || 0.2 || 10.4
|-
| style="text-align:left;"| 2021–22
| style="text-align:left;"| Texas A&M
| 40 || 15 || 26.4 || .490 || .346 || .828 || 3.5 || 2.0 || 1.8 || 0.6 || 14.8
|- class="sortbottom"
| style="text-align:center;" colspan="2"| Career
| 87 || 33 || 24.8 || .453 || .330 || .793 || 3.1 || 1.8 || 1.5 || 0.4 || 11.9

References

External links
Texas A&M Aggies bio
College of Central Florida Patriots bio

1998 births
Living people
American men's basketball players
Basketball players from Los Angeles
Capital City Go-Go players
College of Central Florida Patriots men's basketball players
Texas A&M Aggies men's basketball players
Undrafted National Basketball Association players
Washington Wizards players